William Guy Lovell (born 16 February 1969) is a former English cricketer.

Born at Whitehaven, Lovell made a single appearance in List A cricket for Essex against Lancashire at Old Trafford in the 1991 Refuge Assurance League. He wasn't called upon to bat during the match, but did bowl six wicketless overs. Two years later he played minor counties cricket for Cumberland, making two appearances in the Minor Counties Championship. He later played one match for the Lancashire Cricket Board in the 1998 Minor Counties Knockout Trophy.

After his brief playing career, Lovell became a plumber in Lancashire. Alongside Don Topley, he later alleged that the match he played in between Lancashire and Essex was fixed.

References

External links

1969 births
Living people
Sportspeople from Whitehaven
Cricketers from Cumbria
English cricketers
Essex cricketers
Cumberland cricketers
Lancashire Cricket Board cricketers